Cabri is a town in southwestern Saskatchewan directly north of Gull Lake, northwest of Swift Current and east of the Great Sand Hills. It was incorporated as a village in 1912 and as a town in 1917.

The Cabri ferry started operation in 1912, crossing the South Saskatchewan River between the village of Cabri and the town that is now known as Kyle.

Name 
There are several interpretations surrounding the origin of the town's name, all of which revolve around the indigenous pronghorn antelope. Local folklore suggests that it was the early settlers' pronunciation of the First Nations word for "antelope". Another possibility is that it was derived from the Latin word Antilocapridae, the genus to which the pronghorn belongs. Another suggestion is that voyageurs and Metis thought that pronghorns look like goats, and called them "cabri", a French equivalent word for goat.

Demographics 

Education 
Cabri School, part of the Chinook School Division, is a small school with about 100 students.

Transportation 
Cabri is along Highway 32, which runs from the city of Swift Current to the town of Leader. It is also along the Great Sandhill Railway line from Swift Curren to Burstall. There is a small local airport, the Cabri Airport.

Cabri Area IBA 
The town of Cabri is at the centre of the Cabri Area (SK 045) Important Bird Area (IBA) of Canada. The site is an important habitat for the burrowing owl, ferruginous hawk, Ross's goose, and the mallard duck.

Notable residents 
 Bobby Gimby -  orchestra leader, trumpeter, and singer/songwriter

See also 
 Cabri Regional Park
 List of communities in Saskatchewan
 List of towns in Saskatchewan

References

Further reading 
 Cabri History Book Committee, Through the Years: History of Cabri and District, 1984
 Glenn Sawyer, The Cabri Ferry Crossing and Its Changing Faces, 2008

External links 

Towns in Saskatchewan
Important Bird Areas of Saskatchewan